St. Edmund Catholic School is a private, Catholic elementary school and high school in Eunice, Louisiana, United States.  It is located in the Diocese of Lafayette.

Background
St. Edmund Catholic School was established in 1911. It is the home of the St. Edmund Blue Jays. It enrolls students in grades PK-3 through 12. St. Edmund is a ministry of St. Anthony of Padua Catholic Church.

Athletics
St. Edmund High athletics competes in the LHSAA.

Notable alumni

Notes and references

External links
 

Catholic secondary schools in Louisiana
Schools in Acadia Parish, Louisiana
Educational institutions established in 1911
Schools in St. Landry Parish, Louisiana
1911 establishments in Louisiana